The Quiet One(s)  may refer to:

 The Quiet One (film), a 1948 American documentary directed by Sidney Meyers
 The Quiet Ones (2010 film), an American horror film directed by Amel J. Figueroa
 The Quiet Ones (2014 film), a British horror film directed by John Pogue
 "The Quiet One" (song), by the Who, 1981
 "The Quiet Ones", a song by Oasis, a B-side of the single "The Importance of Being Idle", 2005
 The Quiet One, or Harumi, a fictional character from Ninjago

See also
 "A Quiet One", a short story by Anne McCaffrey from her collection The Girl Who Heard Dragons